The Army Airmobile Force (FAMET) is the army aviation branch of the Spanish Army. An Independent Army Aviation force was formed in 1965 as Aviación Ligera del Ejército de Tierra (Army Light Air Force) and renamed FAMET in 1973.

Organization 
 Headquarter (Colmenar Viejo - Madrid)
 Melilla Permanent Detachment -- (Melilla)

Order of Battle 

 Attack Helicopter Battalion #1 -- BHELA I (Almagro - Ciudad Real)

 Emergency Helicopter Battalion # 2 -- BHELEME II (Bétera - Valencia)

 Maneuver Helicopter Battalion # 3 -- BHELMA III (Agoncillo - Logroño)

 Maneuver Helicopter Battalion # 4 -- BHELMA IV (El Copero - Sevilla)

 Transport Helicopter Battalion # 5 -- BHELTRA V (Colmenar Viejo - Madrid)
 FAMET Transmission Battalion -- BTRANS (Colmenar Viejo - Madrid)
 FAMET Logistic Support Unit -- ULOG (Colmenar Viejo - Madrid)
 Helicopter Maintenance Center -- PCMHEL (Colmenar Viejo - Madrid)
 FAMET Training Center -- CEFAMET (Colmenar Viejo - Madrid)
 Quarter service unit of "Coronel Maté" Base -- USBA "Coronel Maté" (Colmenar Viejo - Madrid)

 Maneuver Helicopter Battalion # 6 -- BHELMA VI (Los Rodeos - Tenerife)

Aircraft

|-
| Agusta-Bell 212
| 
| Rotorcraft
| Utility
|
| 6
|
| 
|-
| Eurocopter AS332B1 Super Puma
|  /  / 
| Rotorcraft
| Transport
|
| 16
|
| 
|-
| Eurocopter AS532UL Cougar
|  /  / 
| Rotorcraft
| Transport
|
| 17
|
| 
|-
| Eurocopter EC-135
|  / 
| Rotorcraft
| Trainer/utility
|
| 16
| 
| 
|-
| Eurocopter Tiger
|  /  /  / 
| Rotorcraft
| Attack
| 
| 24
|
| 
|-
| NHI NH90
|  /  /  / 
| Rotorcraft
| Transport
|
| 15
| 
| 36 on order
|-
| Boeing CH-47D Chinook
| 
| Rotorcraft
| Transport
| 
| 17

| 1 on order
| To be upgraded to the CH-47F variant in 2019.
|}

Historic Aircraft
 Bell UH-1B Iroquois
 Bell UH-1H Iroquois
 Boeing-Vertol CH-47C Chinook
 MBB Bo.105C

References

External links 

 FAMET Home Page official site 
 Colmenar Viejo Base - LECV
 Home page of the Spanish Army

Army units and formations of Spain
Military units and formations established in 1965
Spain